The following is a maintained list of contemporary Australian environmental and cultural incidents that have resulted in destroyed, degraded or damaged notable cultural or environmental items.

The intention of this list is to create a hospitable environment for the contribution and creation of a detailed lineage of intentional and unintentional anthropogenic activities or actors that continue to contribute to the ongoing degradation of Australian and First Nations cultural heritage and environmental sites.

The term incidents refers to any significant human activity, accidental or not, that contributes or creates the conditions in which environmental and cultural heritage is degraded. Conditions of degradation can be determined if the item or event, without human interaction would have sustained itself markedly better.

Entries considered suitable for this article

 The incident itself has an anthropogenic underlying cause or interaction
 The entry does not already have enough notability to warrant its own article, such as the Juukan Gorge disaster.

Fish kills also occurred in late 2022 and early 2023.

Conventional ecosystems

Murray Darling fish kills (2018 and January 2019)

Mining and resource extraction related incidents

Whitehaven Coal billion litter water theft (2016–2019)

Adani Abbot Point coal spill (2017)

Cultural heritage items

Djab Wurrung directions tree destruction (2018)

See also
 Environmentalism in Australia
 Conservation in Australia

References

environmental incidents
Contemporary environmental incidents
Contemporary environmental incidents
Environmentalism in Australia